Nikolay Novotelnov (9 December 1911, Saint Petersburg – 30 December 2006, Saint Petersburg) was Russian chess International Master (1951) and author.

He was champion of Leningrad and won Russian Federated Republics championship in 1947. He was 6th at the Chigorin Memorial Tournament in 1947.

Notable games
Ratmir Kholmov vs Nikolay Novotelnov, Chigorin mem 1947, Spanish Game: Open Variations, Classical Defense (C83), 0-1
Nikolay Novotelnov vs Svetozar Gligoric, Chigorin mem 1947, Neo-Grünfeld Defence: Delayed Exchange Variation (D74), 1-0
Nikolay Novotelnov vs Vasily Smyslov, Ch URS, Moscow 1951, Nimzo-Indian Defense: Gligoric System (E56), 1-0

References

External links

Nikolay Novotelnov at 365Chess.com
Nikolay Novotelnov at New in Chess
Interview with Nikolay Novotelnov

1911 births
2006 deaths
Sportspeople from Saint Petersburg
Soviet chess players
Russian chess players
Russian chess writers
Chess International Masters
20th-century chess players